Events in the year 2021 in the Gambia.

Incumbents
President: Adama Barrow 
Vice-President of the Gambia: Isatou Touray
Chief Justice: Hassan Bubacar Jallow

Events

Ongoing — COVID-19 pandemic in the Gambia
4 January – Musu Bakoto Sawo, 30, ("Think Young Women") is chosen as 2020 Daily Trust "African of the Year". She lectures at the Faculty of Law, University of the Gambia.
4 December – 2021 Gambian presidential election.

Deaths

References

 
2020s in the Gambia
Years of the 21st century in the Gambia
Gambia
Gambia